Journal of Hepatology is a peer-reviewed scientific journal that was established in 1985 by Munksgaard International Publishers.  A supplement, Journal of Hepatology Supplement was also published in 1985, but ceased in the same year.

Elsevier took over publication in 2001. The journal is currently edited by Paolo Angeli and is published on a monthly basis. It is associated with the European Association for the Study of the Liver.

Abstracting and indexing 
Journal of Hepatology is abstracted and indexed the following bibliographic databases:

According to the Journal Citation Reports, the journal has a 2021 impact factor of 30.083.

References

External links 
 

Monthly journals
Gastroenterology and hepatology journals
Publications established in 1985
Elsevier academic journals